Terrance Donnell Brooks (born January 1, 1966) is a former safety who played 3 seasons for the San Francisco 49ers in the National Football League (NFL).  He started in Super Bowl XXIV. During his college years, he coined the name "Wrecking Crew" for the Texas A&M University football team defense.

Brooks suffered a career-ending injury during the 49ers' game vs. the Green Bay Packers at Lambeau Field on November 4, 1990.

References

1966 births
Living people
People from Midland, Texas
American football safeties
Texas A&M Aggies football players
San Francisco 49ers players
Ed Block Courage Award recipients